The Central Islip Union Free School District, also known as the Central Islip Public Schools, is a school district on Long Island, New York. Its headquarters are in Central Islip in the town of Islip.

History
In 1997 the voters approved the districts revised budget proposal, which called for installing five computers in each classroom and updating the technology in the schools to contemporary standards.

As of 2007 the school district had 6,100 students.

Schools
 Central Islip Senior High School (grades 9-12, Central Islip)
 Ralph G. Reed Middle School (grades 7-8, Central Islip)
Elementary schools (grades K-6):
 Cordello Avenue Elementary School (Central Islip)
 Andrew T. Morrow Elementary School (Islandia)
 Marguerite Mulvey Elementary School (Central Islip)
 Francis J. O'Neill Elementary School (Central Islip)
 Anthony Alfano Elementary School (Central Islip) (also houses pre-kindergarten)
 Charles A. Mulligan Elementary School (Central Islip)

References

Further reading
"Central Islip OKs School Budget." Newsday. October 26, 1989. News p. 30.
Negron, Edna. "Upset in Central Islip School Race." Newsday. June 2, 1989. News p. 25.
Bridges, Christine Saint James. "Why One Family Left Central Islip." Newsday. September 7, 1990. Viewpoints (Opinion) p. 80.
Crichton, Sarah. "C. Islip school district could recover $42M." Newsday. Wednesday June 22, 2011.

External links

Central Islip Public Schools
Anthony Alfano Early Childhood Center (on Angelfire)

Education in Suffolk County, New York
Islip (town), New York
School districts in New York (state)